Raoul Aslan (born Tigran Aslanyan, Armenian: Տիգրան Ասլանյան; 16 October 1886 – 17 June 1958) was an Austrian theater actor of Greek-Armenian ancestry.

Life
Born in Saloniki, Ottoman Empire (now in Greece), Aslan lived in Vienna from 1897 until his death. In 1917 he joined the "Deutsche Volkstheater" in Vienna and was active at the Vienna Burgtheater from 1920 to 1958, where he mainly played classical heroes and complex characters such as Hamlet, Mephisto, Marquis Posa, and Nathan. Aslan was the director of the Vienna Burgtheater from 1945 to 1948. In 1929 he was the first actor to be awarded the title "Kammerschauspieler". Raoul Aslan was listed on the Gottbegnadeten list of Joseph Goebbels as an important artist.

Quotes
Aslan once said to fellow actor Gustaf Gründgens: "Mr. Gründgens, you're the greatest German actor, I am the greatest German actor. But one thing you should never forget: My family comes from Konstantinopel via Thessaloniki to Vienna. And you, Mr. Gründgens, you are from Düsseldorf."

Selected filmography
 The Other I (1918)
 The Venus (1922)
 The Flute Concert of Sanssouci (1930)
 Yorck (1931)
 The White Demon (1932)
 Narcotics (1932)
 Gently My Songs Entreat (1933)
 Invisible Opponent (1933)
 The Oil Sharks (1933)
 Mirror of Life (1938)
 Mozart (1955)
 Goetz von Berlichingen (1955)

References

1886 births
1958 deaths
Austrian male stage actors
Austrian male film actors
Austrian male silent film actors
Armenians from the Ottoman Empire
Emigrants from the Ottoman Empire to Austria-Hungary
Austrian people of Armenian descent
Male actors from Vienna
Ethnic Armenian male actors
Austrian LGBT actors
Greek LGBT actors
20th-century Austrian male actors

Armenian LGBT people